Mingo Creek is a stream in Bates County in the U.S. state of Missouri. It is a tributary of the South Grand River.

The stream flows generally north passing under Missouri Route 18 one mile southwest of the community of Altona.

Mingo Creek has the name of the Mingo Native Americans.

See also
List of rivers of Missouri

References

Rivers of Bates County, Missouri
Rivers of Missouri